Naut Aran is a municipality in the comarca of the Val d'Aran in Catalonia, Spain. It is the second largest municipality in Catalonia in terms of surface area (225.8 km², behind Tremp), and was created in 1967 by the merger of the municipalities of Arties, Salardú, Gessa, Tredòs and Bagergue: the former municipalities retain some privileges as "decentralised municipal entities" (entitats municipals descentralitzades, EMD). The name literally means "Upper Valley" in Aranese, and both the Garonne (Garona) and the Noguera Pallaresa have their sources on the territory of the municipality. The town hall is in Salardú. The municipality is linked to Vielha by the C-28 road, which continues to Alt Àneu over the Port de la Bonaigua (2072 m). This road, the higher stretches of which are impassable in winter, was the only route between the Aran Valley and the rest of Spain before the opening of the Vielha tunnel in 1948.

Economy 
The local economy is based almost entirely on tourism and winter sports. The ski resort of Vaquèira-Beret is one of the largest in the Pyrenees. A number of local churches have been classified as historic-artistic monuments:
Church of Sant Andreu de Salardú, which houses a thirteenth-century sculpture of Christ (el Crist de Salardú)
Church of Santa Maria, in Arties
Church of Santa Eulària d'Unha (12th century)

Demography 
Population figures from before 1967 are the totals for the five municipalities which combined to form Naut Aran.

Subdivisions 
The municipality is composed of nine distinct settlements:
Arties (445)
Bagerque (65)
Garós (160), in the EMD of Arties e Garòs
Gessa (127)
Montgarri (1)
Salardú (367)
Tredós (150)
Unha (75), in the EMD of Tredòs e Unha
Vaquèira (108)

Note 
 Entitats municipals descentralitzades are governed by the Llei Municipal i de Règim Local de Catalunya (8/1987 de 15 d'abril de 1987). They correspond to entidades locales menores in the rest of Spain (known as entitats locals menors in the Valencian Community and the Balearic Islands).

References

 Panareda Clopés, Josep Maria; Rios Calvet, Jaume; Rabella Vives, Josep Maria (1989). Guia de Catalunya, Barcelona: Caixa de Catalunya.  (Spanish).  (Catalan).

External links 

Official site
 Government data pages 

Municipalities in Val d'Aran